Antonina Pustovit (born 16 October 1955) is a Ukrainian former rower who competed in the 1980 Summer Olympics.

References

External links
 

1955 births
Living people
Ukrainian female rowers
Soviet female rowers
Olympic rowers of the Soviet Union
Rowers at the 1980 Summer Olympics
Olympic silver medalists for the Soviet Union
Olympic medalists in rowing
Medalists at the 1980 Summer Olympics